Mumetopia is a genus of flies in the family Anthomyzidae. There are at least four described species in Mumetopia.

Species
These four species belong to the genus Mumetopia:
 Mumetopia nigrimana (Coquillett, 1900)
 Mumetopia occipitalis Melander, 1913
 Mumetopia taeniata Rohacek & Barber
 Mumetopia terminalis (Loew, 1863)

References

Further reading

 

Anthomyzidae
Articles created by Qbugbot
Opomyzoidea genera